The 2018 Alabama A&M Bulldogs football team represents Alabama Agricultural and Mechanical University in the 2018 NCAA Division I FCS football season. The Bulldogs are led by first-year head coach Connell Maynor and play their home games at Louis Crews Stadium in Huntsville, Alabama as members of the East Division of the Southwestern Athletic Conference.

Previous season
The Bulldogs finished the 2017 season 4–7, 3–4 in SWAC play to finish in third place in the East Division.

Preseason

SWAC football media day
During the SWAC football media day held in Birmingham, Alabama on July 13, 2018, the Bulldogs were predicted to finish fourth in the East Division.

Media poll

Presason All-SWAC Team
The Bulldogs had three players selected to Preseason All-SWAC Teams.

Offense
2nd team

Jordan Bentley – Jr. RB

Defense
1st team

Vernon Moland – Sr. DL

Dylan Hamilton – Sr. DB

Schedule

Source:

Game summaries

Miles

North Alabama

at Cincinnati

vs Southern

at Jackson State

at Texas Southern

Alcorn State

vs Alabama State

at Arkansas–Pine Bluff

Grambling State

at Mississippi Valley State

References

Alabama AandM
Alabama AandM Bulldogs football team
Alabama A&M Bulldogs football seasons